Francesco Morini (12 August 1944 – 31 August 2021) was an Italian professional footballer who played as a defender. He competed for the Italy national team in the 1974 FIFA World Cup and earned a total of 11 caps. He played for clubs such as Sampdoria and, most notably, Juventus, with which he achieved great success. Morini was a fast, strong, and tenacious centre-back, with good technique, who was known for his tackling ability, as well as his tight marking of opposing forwards. He was given the nickname "Morgan the Pirate" as he excelled as a powerful ball-winner; despite his physical style of play, he was also known for his correct behaviour on the pitch, and he rarely committed aggressive challenges. On the pitch, he was also well known for his rivalry with Inter forward Roberto Boninsegna, who later became his teammate. After his retirement he worked as Juventus's sporting director for several years.

Club career

Morini made his Serie A debut for Sampdoria in a 2–0 loss against Roma on 2 February 1964, and in 1969, he was transferred to Juventus. He made 387 appearances in Serie A, as well as 30 in Serie B with Sampdoria during the 1966–67 season, during which he won the title.

During a highly successful domestic and European stint with Juventus, Morini won five Serie A titles, a Coppa Italia during the 1978–79 season, and an UEFA Cup during the 1976–77 season, also reaching the European Cup final during the 1972–73 season, and the semi-final of the European Cup Winners' Cup during the 1979–80 season, his final season at the club. Throughout his professional footballing career as a defender, Morini never scored a goal; although he once appeared to score one during a friendly tournament, it was disallowed. Morini ended his career in Canada with the Toronto Blizzard.

International career
Morini made his international debut for the Italy national team in a 1–0 home win over Turkey on 25 February 1973, and was a member of the Italian squad that took part in the 1974 FIFA World Cup. He played for Italy 11 times between 1973 and 1975. Although he was still part of the Italian national side during the mid-70s, he was notably excluded by Enzo Bearzot from the Italian squad that finished in fourth place at the 1978 FIFA World Cup.

Personal life
Morini had two sons; one is Jacopo Morini, who is known for his role in the Italian television program "Le Iene", and the other, Andrea, is a singer and guitarist in a band.

Honours
Juventus
 Serie A: 1971–72, 1972–73, 1974–75, 1976–77, 1977–78
 Coppa Italia: 1978–79
 UEFA Cup: 1976–77

Sampdoria
Serie B: 1966–67

References

External links
Profile at Enciclopediadelcalcio.it 
Profile  at FIGC.it 

1944 births
2021 deaths
1974 FIFA World Cup players
Expatriate soccer players in Canada
Italian expatriate footballers
Italian expatriate sportspeople in Canada
Italian footballers
Italy international footballers
Juventus F.C. players
Juventus F.C. directors
Serie A players
Serie B players
Toronto Blizzard (1971–1984) players
U.C. Sampdoria players
North American Soccer League (1968–1984) players
Association football defenders
UEFA Cup winning players
Sportspeople from the Province of Pisa
Footballers from Tuscany